A monogenic  function is a complex function with a single finite derivative. 

Alternatively, it can be defined as the above limit having the same value for all paths. Functions can either have a single derivative (monogenic) or infinitely many derivatives (polygenic), with no intermediate cases.

References 

Mathematical analysis
Functions and mappings